A pre-existing disease in pregnancy is a disease that is not directly caused by the pregnancy, in contrast to various complications of pregnancy, but which may become worse or be a potential risk to the pregnancy (such as causing pregnancy complications). A major component of this risk can result from necessary use of drugs in pregnancy to manage the disease.

In such circumstances, women who wish to continue with a pregnancy require extra medical care, often from an interdisciplinary team. Such a team might include (besides an obstetrician) a specialist in the disorder and other practitioners (for example, maternal-fetal specialists or obstetric physicians, dieticians, etc.).

Chronic hypertension 
Chronic hypertension in pregnancy can lead to increased complications for both the mother and fetus. Maternal complications include superimposed pre-eclampsia and caesarean delivery. Fetal complications include preterm delivery, low birth weight, and death. Increasing rates of obesity and metabolic syndrome play a key role in the increased prevalence of chronic hypertension and associated complications. While high blood pressure treatment has been shown to decrease the incidence of severe hypertension during pregnancy, there was no significant difference in pregnancy complications (for example, superimposed pre-eclampsia, stillbrith/neonatal death, small for gestational age).

Endocrine disorders

Diabetes mellitus

Diabetes mellitus and pregnancy deals with the interactions of diabetes mellitus (not restricted to gestational diabetes) and pregnancy. Risks for the child include miscarriage, growth restriction, growth acceleration, fetal obesity (macrosomia), polyhydramnios and birth defects.

Thyroid disease

Thyroid disease in pregnancy can, if uncorrected, cause adverse effects on fetal and maternal well-being. The deleterious effects of thyroid dysfunction can also extend beyond pregnancy and delivery to affect neurointellectual development in the early life of the child. Demand for thyroid hormones is increased during pregnancy which may cause a previously unnoticed thyroid disorder to worsen. The most effective way of screening for thyroid dysfunction is not known. A review found that more women were diagnosed with thyroid dysfunction when all pregnant women were tested instead of just testing those at 'high-risk' of thyroid problems (those with family history, signs or symptoms). Finding more women with thyroid dysfunction meant that the women could have treatment and management through their pregnancies. However the outcomes of the pregnancies were surprisingly similar so more research is needed to look at the effects of screening all pregnant women for thyroid problems.

Hypercoagulability

Hypercoagulability in pregnancy is the propensity of pregnant women to develop thrombosis (blood clots) such as a deep vein thrombosis with a potential subsequent pulmonary embolism. Pregnancy itself is a factor of hypercoagulability (pregnancy-induced hypercoaguability), as a physiologically adaptive mechanism to prevent post partum bleeding. The pregnancy associated hypercoaguability is attributed to an increased synthesis of coagulation factors, such as fibrinogen, by the liver through the effects of estrogen.

When combined with any additional underlying hypercoagulable state, the risk of thrombosis or embolism may become substantial. Multiple pre-existing genetic disorders can worsen the hypercoaguable state observed in pregnancy. Examples include:
 Factor V Leiden
 Prothrombin G20210A
 Protein C deficiency
 Protein S deficiency
 Antithrombin III deficiency

Infections

Vertically transmitted infections

Many infectious diseases have a risk of vertical transmission to the fetus, known as TORCH infections. Examples based on the TORCHES acronym include:
 Toxoplasma
 Other: Parvovirus B19, Zika, Chickenpox
 Rubella
 Cytomegalovirus
 Herpes simplex or Neonatal herpes simplex
 HIV
 Syphilis

Infections in pregnancy also raise particular concerns about whether or not to use drugs in pregnancy (that is, antibiotics or antivirals) to treat them. For example, pregnant women who contract H1N1 influenza infection are recommended to receive antiviral therapy with either oseltamivir (which is the preferred medication) or zanamivir. Both amantadine and rimantadine have been found to be teratogenic and embryotoxic when given at high doses in animal studies.

Candidal vulvovaginitis
In pregnancy, changes in the levels of female sex hormones, such as estrogen, make a woman more likely to develop candidal vulvovaginitis. During pregnancy, the Candida fungus is more prevalent (common), and recurrent infection is also more likely. There is no clear evidence that treatment of asymptomatic candidal vulvovaginitis in pregnancy reduces the risk of preterm birth. Candidal vulvovaginitis in pregnancy should be treated with intravaginal clotrimazole or nystatin for at least 7 days.

Bacterial vaginosis
Bacterial vaginosis is an imbalance of naturally occurring bacterial flora in the vagina. Bacterial vaginosis occurring during pregnancy may increase the risk of pregnancy complications, most notably premature birth or miscarriage. However, this risk is small overall and appears more significant in women who have had such complications in an earlier pregnancy.

Valvular heart disease

In case of valvular heart disease in pregnancy, the maternal physiological changes in pregnancy confer additional load on the heart and may lead to complications.

In individuals who require an artificial heart valve, consideration must be made for deterioration of the valve over time (for bioprosthetic valves) versus the risks of blood clotting in pregnancy with mechanical valves with the resultant need of drugs in pregnancy in the form of anticoagulants.

Other autoimmune disorders

Celiac disease 
Untreated celiac disease can cause spontaneous abortion (miscarriage), intrauterine growth restriction, small for gestational age, low birthweight and preterm birth. Often reproductive disorders are the only manifestation of undiagnosed celiac disease and most cases are not recognized. Complications or failures of pregnancy cannot be explained simply by malabsorption, but by the autoimmune response elicited by the exposure to gluten, which causes damage to the placenta. The gluten-free diet avoids or reduces the risk of developing reproductive disorders in pregnant women with celiac disease. Also, pregnancy can be a trigger for the development of celiac disease in  genetically susceptible women who are consuming gluten.

Systemic lupus erythematosus

Systemic lupus erythematosus and pregnancy confers an increased rate of fetal death in utero and spontaneous abortion (miscarriage), as well as of neonatal lupus.

Behçet's disease
Pregnancy does not have an adverse effect on the course of Behçet's disease and may possibly ameliorate its course. Still, there is a substantial variability in clinical course between patients and even for different pregnancies in the same patient. Also, the other way around, Behçet's disease confers an increased risk of pregnancy complications, miscarriage and Cesarean section.

Multiple sclerosis
Being pregnant decreases the risk of relapse in multiple sclerosis; however, during the first months after delivery the risk increases. Overall, pregnancy does not seem to influence long-term disability. Multiple sclerosis does not increase the risk of congenital abnormality or miscarriage.

Mental health

Depression in pregnancy 
The effects of depression during pregnancy are difficult to parse from depression before pregnancy as the symptoms of the two overlap. However, the biggest risk factor of depression during pregnancy is a prior history of depression. Most of the research is focused on the consequences of untreated depression regardless if the depression developed during pregnancy or if it was there before conception. Untreated depression has been linked to premature birth, low birth weight, fetal growth restriction, and postnatal complications. On the other hand, however, anti-depressant medications also come with a small risk of pre-term birth, low birth weight, and persistent pulmonary hypertension.

Respiratory disease

Asthma 
In the United States, the prevalence of asthma among pregnant women is between 8.4% and 8.8%. Asthma in pregnant women is strongly associated with multiple adverse health outcomes, including pre-eclampsia, preterm birth, and low birth weight. Other conditions such as gestational diabetes, placenta previa, and hemorrhage are inconsistently correlated to asthma. Poorly controlled and severe asthma may exacerbate conditions associated with maternal and neonate morbidity and mortality. Asthma treatment recommendations during pregnancy are similar to those in non-pregnant women.

Structural (congenital) abnormalities of the uterus 
Structural abnormalities of the uterus include conditions like septate uterus, bicornuate uterus, arcuate uterus, and didelphys uterus. Most of these abnormalities occur when the Müllerian ducts are fused improperly or incompletely. Women with these congenital abnormalities are usually unaware as these conditions do not usually do not present any symptoms. During pregnancy, these conditions are associated with infertility, preterm birth, fetal malpresentation, and early miscarriages. Among these uterine abnormalities, those with canalization defects, i.e., not having a normal uterine canal such as septate defects have the worse pregnancy outcomes. Surgical treatment is only recommended for individuals who have had recurrent miscarriages and have a septate uterus; however, the risks of surgery, especially scarring of the womb should be considered. Further evidence from randomized controlled trials are required to establish conclusively whether surgery is the better option when its risks and rewards are compared with the risks of the adverse pregnancy outcomes.

Others
The following conditions may also become worse or be a potential risk to the pregnancy:
 Cancer
 Chronic hypertension
 Cirrhosis
 Congenital disorders that may be passed on to offspring
 Heart defects, especially primary pulmonary hypertension and Eisenmenger's syndrome
 Kidney disorders
 Mental health.
 Depression has been linked to higher rates of preterm delivery.
 Respiratory disorders and diseases (associated, for example, with placental abruption)
 Asthma
 Seizure disorders
 Structural abnormalities in the cervix
 Structural abnormalities in the uterus
 Viral hepatitis

References